Singapore participated in the 1954 Asian Games held in the capital city of Manila, Philippines. This country was ranked 9th with a gold medal, 4 silver medals and 4 bronze medals with a total of 9 medals.

Medalists

Medal summary

Medal table

References

Nations at the 1954 Asian Games
Singapore at the Asian Games
1954 in Singapore